Events from the year 1453 in France.

Incumbents

 Monarch – Charles VII

Events
 Ongoing since 1449 – The Revolt of Ghent, lasted from 1449 to 1453.
17 July – The Battle of Castillon in Gascony. A decisive French victory, it is considered to mark the end the Hundred Years' War.

Births

Deaths

17 July – John Talbot, 1st Earl of Shrewsbury (born c. 1387) was killed during the Battle of Castillon.
Unknown – Mathieu de Foix-Comminges, Count of Comminges between 1419 and 1443

References

1450s in France